The Antarctic Floristic Kingdom, also the Holantarctic Kingdom, is a floristic kingdom that includes most areas of the world south of 40°S latitude. It was first identified by botanist Ronald Good, and later by Armen Takhtajan. The Antarctic Floristic Kingdom is a classification in phytogeography, different from the Antarctic realm classification in biogeography, and from Antarctic flora genera/species classifications in botany.

Geography
The Antarctic Floristic Kingdom includes the continent of Antarctica, Patagonia (southern Chile, southern Argentina, Tierra del Fuego), most of New Zealand, the New Zealand Subantarctic Islands, and all islands of the Southern Ocean south of 40°S latitude, including Gough Island, the Kerguelen Islands, and the Falkland Islands. Tasmania is omitted since its plant species are more closely related to those found in the Australian Floristic Kingdom.

Flora
The flora of the Antarctic Kingdom dates back to the time of Gondwana, the southern supercontinent which once included most of the landmasses of the present-day Southern Hemisphere, though it has been influenced by the flora of the Holarctic Kingdom since the Tertiary period. Ronald Good noted, as had Joseph Dalton Hooker much earlier, that many plant species of Antarctica, temperate South America and New Zealand were very closely related, despite their disjunction by the vast Southern Ocean.

According to Ronald Good, about 50 genera of vascular plants are common in the Antarctic Floristic Kingdom, including Nothofagus and Dicksonia. Takhtajan also made note of hundreds of other vascular plant genera scattered and isolated on islands of the Southern Ocean, including Calandrinia feltonii of the Falkland Islands, Pringlea antiscorbutica of the Kerguelen Islands, and the megaherb genera of the New Zealand Subantarctic Islands.

According to Takhtajan, the following families are endemic or subendemic to this kingdom: Thyrsopteridaceae, Lactoridaceae, Gomortegaceae, Hectorellaceae (Hectorella), Halophytaceae, Malesherbiaceae, Francoaceae, Aextoxicaceae, Vivianiaceae, Misodendraceae, Tribelaceae, Griseliniaceae and Alseuosmiaceae.

Subdivisions
The Antarctic Floristic Kingdom is subdivided into four floristic regions, and subdivided even further into sixteen floristic provinces. Most of the provinces lie within, or very near the Antarctic convergence zone.

Floristic Regions
The Floristic Regions in the Antarctic Floristic Kingdom are the:
Fernandezian Region
Argentina-Chile-Patagonian Region
South Subantarctic Islands Region
Neozeylandic Region

Fernandezian Region
The Fernandezian Region is often also included within the Neotropical Kingdom. It includes the Juan Fernández Islands and Desventuradas Islands archipelagoes off the west coast of Chile.
Endemic family: Lactoridaceae.
Endemic genera: 20, including Thyrsopteris, Nothomyrcia, Selkirkia, Cuminia, Juania, Robinsonia, Rhetinodendron, Symphyochaeta, Centaurodendron, Yunquea, Hesperogreigia, Podophorus, Pantathera and Megalachne. 
Species endemism of vascular plants is very high (about 70%).
Provinces
Juan Fernández Province

Argentina-Chile-Patagonian Region

Within southern South America, in regions of Chile and Argentina.
Endemic families: Gomortegaceae, Halophytaceae, Malesherbiaceae, Tribelaceae, Francoaceae, Aextoxicaceae, Misodendraceae.
Endemic genera: many, including Leptocionium, Saxegothaea, Austrocedrus, Pilgerodendron, Fitzroya, Peumus, Boquila, Lardizabala, Philippiella, Austrocactus, Holmbergia, Berberidopsis, Niederleinia, Lebetanthus, Ovidia, Quillaja, Kageneckia, Saxifragella, Zuccagnia, Tepualia, Tropaeolum, Gymnophyton, Laretia, Mulinum, Talguenea, Schizanthus, Melosperma, Monttea, Hygea, Mitraria, Sarmienta, Chiliotrichum, Melalema, Nassauvia, Tetroncium, Gilliesia, Leontochir, Leucocryne, Schickendantziella, Solaria, Lapageria, Conanthera, Tecophilaea, Tapeinia, Fascicularia, Ortachne, Jubaea 
Endemic species: many.
Provinces
Northern Chilean Province
Central Chilean Province
Argentine Pampas Province
Patagonian Province
Tierra del Fuego Province

Neozeylandic Region

The greater New Zealand islands region, including: the Zealandia islands (e.g. North Island, South Island), the New Zealand outlying islands, and the New Zealand Subantarctic Islands.
Endemic family: Ixerbaceae an endemic monogeneric family of one species, Ixerba brexioides. The only endemic New Zealand vascular plant family. 
Endemic genera: 50, including Loxsoma, Pseudowintera, Hectorella, Entelea, Hoheria, Corokia, Alseuosmia, Carmichaelia, Lophomyrtus, Neomyrtus, Plectomirtha, Stilbocarpa, Kirkophytum, Coxella, Lignocarpa, Scandia, Dactylanthus, Myosotidium, Parahebe, Negria, Rhabdothamnus, Teucridium, Oreostylidium, Pachystegia, Haastia, Leucogenes, Phormium, Rhopalostylis, Lepidorrhachis, Hedyscepe, Howea, Sporadanthus, Aporostylis, Desmoschoenus), 
Endemic species: very high species endemism, especially among Pinophyta. 
Provinces
Lord Howe Province
Norfolkian Province
Kermadecian Province
Northern Neozeylandic Province
Central Neozeylandic Province
Southern Neozeylandic Province
Chatham Province
New Zealand Subantarctic Islands Province

South Subantarctic Islands Region
The South Subantarctic Islands
Endemic species: Lyallia kerguelensis, Pringlea antiscorbutica
Tristan—Gough Province
Kerguelen Province

See also
Antarctic flora
Antarctic realm
Flora of Antarctica (category link)
List of Antarctic and subantarctic islands

References

External links
Encyclopædia Britannica: Antarctic Floristic Kingdom

Floristic kingdoms
 Kingdom
Floristic kingdom